Derog Gioura (1 September 1932 – 25 September 2008) was a Nauruan political figure. He was President of the Republic of Nauru (acting) in 2003.

Political role 

Gioura has been fighting many years with Kennan Adeang over a parliamentary seat in the Ubenide constituency, resulting in numerous vacations and by-elections between them two; the fight ended when they were both continually elected since 1980.

Gioura was the Speaker of the Parliament of Nauru from 1987 until November 1992.

He served as Minister Assisting the President of Nauru in cabinets of Kennan Adeang, Bernard Dowiyogo and René Harris in 1986, 2000-2001, 2003, 2003, 2003-2004. He was Minister of Finance in the cabinet of Bernard Dowiyogo from December 1998 to April 1999.

During the tumultuous year of 2003, the office of President of Nauru changed hands on six occasions. The perennial challenge for Presidential office-holders in Nauru is to stave off a vote of no confidence, to which frequent recourse is made; in 2003, these factors were particularly acute, given the ill health of President Bernard Dowiyogo.

President of Nauru 

In 2003, on the death in office of President Bernard Dowiyogo, Gioura emerged as President of Nauru, initially on an interim basis. One of the results of Gioura's short period of office was the facilitating of the path of his successor, Ludwig Scotty, who, after a hiatus of several months, oversaw a more stable period of politics in Nauru.

Health 

During his brief Presidency, Gioura underwent a period of enforced absence from the country, since there were concerns for his health; he received a series of medical treatment in Australia.

By the year 2007, Nauruan political figures of Gioura's generation had been somewhat eclipsed by a younger set of leaders: in December 2007 the incoming President of Nauru Marcus Stephen was nearly four decades younger than Derog Gioura. While there were a few changes of President since 2003, Gioura did not resume the office since relinquishing it in that year.

Death

Derog Gioura died in 2008.

See also 
 Politics of Nauru

References 

1932 births
2008 deaths
Members of the Parliament of Nauru
Speakers of the Parliament of Nauru
Presidents of Nauru
Ministers Assisting the President of Nauru
Finance Ministers of Nauru
20th-century Nauruan politicians
21st-century Nauruan politicians